Silvermills, once an ancient village, has been part of Edinburgh since 1809.

The village is most likely to have taken its name from mills erected to smelt and refine silver ore which had been found at Hilderstone in Linlithgowshire in 1607 or, alternatively, from some of the alchemical projects of James IV or James V.

History

The low-lying land of Silvermills and Canonmills proved an impediment to the further northern extension of the New Town.

In the 19th century the area was best known for its great tannery. This together with other industries colonised the lands which until recently were considered uneconomic to develop. No parts of it nor the old mills still exist but until the 1990s remnants did stand on both sides of West Silvermills Lane to the south of Silvermills House (c. 1760) built for Mr. Nicol Somerville. Mill lades serving the mills led from the Water of Leith at a point just north of Stockbridge, through the area and on to Canonmills Loch at Canonmills.

John Lauder of Silvermills (died 28 July 1838), owner of the tannery, and father to the famous brother artists Robert Scott Lauder (1803–1869) and James Eckford Lauder (1811–1869), both born in Silvermills had a house south of the 'Great Mill Lade' (or Lead or Dam), just behind where St. Stephen's Church now stands; the land for the church was purchased by the City of Edinburgh from Mr. Lauder in 1822.

Silvermills was incorporated into Edinburgh in 1809 by a Local Act of Parliament Extending the Royalty (49 Geo III Cap. xxi) passed 28 April.

In 1835 architect George Smith erected St Stephen's School in St.Stephen's Street, which street was laid out in 1825. At the end of this street was a large skating rink designed in 1895 but converted into a theatre five years later. It then became a ballroom which burned down to be replaced by flats in the style of the surrounding Georgian architecture.

Silvermills today

All but Silvermills House itself was redeveloped by 1997, as part of a Council plan for the area. The western side is largely housing. The main estate is by Cala Homes and has a sculpture at its centre, over life-size of a horse and rider holding an eagle, "Horse~Rider~Eagle" by sculptor, Eoghan Bridge. The eastern section contains a two-storey workshop built in brick but with a traditional flavour.

Although redeveloped the medieval routes of both East and West Silvermills Lane were preserved in their entirety. The former steep dog-leg link from the east lane to Fettes Row was removed c.2000 when a residential development was built but a public pedestrian route still exists under the building.

Immediate vicinity
The most prominent building in the immediate vicinity is St. Stephen's Church in St Stephen's Place at the north end of St Vincent Street, built in 1827 for £18,975, on a design of vast scale, a mixture of Baroque and Grecian architecture by William Henry Playfair. Thomas Stevenson, father of Robert Louis Stevenson was a devout and regular attender here. The building is now known at the St Stephen's Centre and is privately owned.

St Vincent's Scottish Episcopal Chapel on the corner of St Vincent Street was built in 1857 in English Gothic on a much smaller scale.  Within is a fine display of modern European heraldry. There's an excellent guide book to describe the 150 or so achievements, shields, stained glass and flags. Between 1971 and 1996, it was the home of the Military and Hospitaller Order of Saint Lazarus of Jerusalem Grand Commandery of Lochore, which had bought the building from the Vestry Trustees in 1971, together with its rectory and church hall. The Trustees of the Commandery of Lochore of the Order of St Lazarus returned the church building to the Vestry Trustees in September 2019, having meanwhile sold the rectory and church hall. It continues as an incumbency within the Scottish Episcopal Diocese of Edinburgh. Services are held every Sunday morning and evening, and Thursday morning.

To the north west, The Royal London Mutual Insurance Society offices on Henderson Row contain as a centrepiece the frontage of the old Edinburgh Tramway offices. The winding gear for this cable-operated tram is preserved on the east side of the office at the entrance to Silvermills at Henderson Place.

To the north east and overlooking Silvermills lies St Bernard's House, a brick building constructed in 1987 by Lothian Homes Limited, with 46 private retirement flats and a warden's flat. The warden's flat became a retirement flat in 2010. Its main entrance is on Henderson Row, the gardens and car park are accessed from West Silvermills Lane. On this site, at the Disruption of the Church of Scotland in 1843, St Bernard's Free Church was founded together with a church hall and a beadle's house. The church was rebuilt in 1856. The Free Church united with the United Presbyterian Church in 1900, forming the United Free Church when it became known as St Bernard's United Free Church. Dean Street Congregation united with St Bernard's United Free Church in 1915. It became St Bernard's South at the Union in 1929 of the Church of Scotland and the United Free Church. The greater part of Dean Street Congregation formed a separate congregation in Queen Street Hall (later the BBC Headquarters) in 1861. The Queen Street Congregation moved to a newly built church in Eyre Crescent, called Davidson Church after its first minister, Rev. Peter Davidson in 1881. St Bernard's South and Davidson united at St Bernard's Davidson Church in 1945. St Bernard's Stockbridge united with St Bernard's Davidson in 1980. It was demolished in 1985.

References

 Romantic Edinburgh, by John Geddie, London, Edinburgh, and Glasgow, 1929, pp. 241–2.
 The Buildings of Scotland - Edinburgh, By John Gifford, Colin McWilliam, and David Walker, London, 1984, 
 Report of the Town-Council Proceedings in The Scotsman newspaper dated 22 Jul 1826.
 Plan of Silvermills, Property of Nicol Somerville, document RHP140448, 1817, in the National Archives of Scotland.

External links
Bartholomew's Chronological map of Edinburgh (1919)

New Town, Edinburgh